Morumbi is a future monorail station, which will be operated by ViaMobilidade. Placed in the district of Santo Amaro in São Paulo, it will connect with homonymous station of Line 9-Emerald.

History
In 2010, it was presented the project of Line 17 of São Paulo Metro, with a connection station project beside the CPTM station. In 2011, the construction was started, but it was interrupted many times because of legal problem between the Metro and builder companies. Currently, is in process of bidding, with conclusion scheduled to mid of 2022.

Toponymy
The word "Morumbi" is an indigenous term of tupi origin that can mean "green fly" (moru: fly, and mbi: green). The ethnologist Eduardo Navarro defends that "Morumbi" has other meanings, as from the tupi maromby, which meaning is "river of the big fishes" (maromba: "big fish"; y: "river"), or marumbi, term of Portuguese language that means "lagoon full of taboas".

Station layout

References

São Paulo Metro stations
Proposed railway stations in Brazil
Railway stations scheduled to open in 2024